Miguel Ángel Martín (born 2 May 1962) is a Spanish professional golfer.

Professional career 
Martín was born in Huelva. He started out as a caddie and turned professional in 1981. He has been a member of the European Tour for more than twenty seasons, and in 2005 he became the first Continental European golfer to make 500 appearances on the tour. He also attempted to make the PGA Tour in 1988. He was one of the 1988 PGA Tour Qualifying School graduates. His best finish on the Order of Merit was 17th in 1996 and he has won three European Tour events. He was also a member of the winning Spanish team at the 2000 Alfred Dunhill Cup.

In 1997 Martín earned a spot in the European Ryder Cup team via the money list, but was forced to withdraw after failing to recover from a wrist injury sustained in July. At the time he felt that he had been excluded in order to have a bigger name player involved. Martín wanted to make his own decision nearer the time, as José María Olazábal had done two years before, but the European Ryder Cup committee requested that he play 18 holes to prove his fitness. He refused as it was just 30 days after his surgery, and despite receiving support from many players, his place on the team was taken by Olazábal, who was next on the qualification list.

Professional wins (12)

European Tour wins (3)

1Co-sanctioned by the PGA Tour of Australasia

European Tour playoff record (1–1)

Hi5 Pro Tour wins (1)

Other wins (8)
1986 SHA Grand Prix
1987 Spanish PGA Championship, Madrid Championship, South Open, Carilo Open
1996 Campeonato de Espana
2000 Madrid Championship
2004 Madrid Championship

Results in major championships

Note: Martín only played in The Open Championship.

CUT = missed the half-way cut
"T" = tied

Results in senior major championships
Results not in chronological order before 2022.

CUT = missed the halfway cut
"T" indicates a tie for a place
NT = No tournament due to COVID-19 pandemic

Team appearances
Europcar Cup (representing Spain): 1988
Alfred Dunhill Cup (representing Spain): 1991, 1994, 1997, 2000 (winners)
Ryder Cup (representing Europe): 1997 (injured, did not play)
World Cup (representing Spain): 1997, 1998, 1999

See also
1988 PGA Tour Qualifying School graduates
Lowest rounds of golf

References

External links

Spanish male golfers
European Tour golfers
European Senior Tour golfers
PGA Tour Champions golfers
Ryder Cup competitors for Europe
Sportspeople from Huelva
Golfers from Madrid
1962 births
Living people
20th-century Spanish people
21st-century Spanish people